The Valley Stream Central High School District is a public central high school district in New York State that serves about 4500 students in most of the village of Valley Stream, most of South Valley Stream, and most of North Valley Stream as well as parts of Elmont, Franklin Square, and Malverne in Nassau County. It is one of only three central high school districts in New York State. There is a nine-member Board of Education which is composed of three appointees from each of the Elementary District Boards (13,24,30).

Schools
The district operates four schools:

Elementary schools
none, see Feeder Schools

Middle schools

Valley Stream Memorial Junior High School is the district junior high school (grades 7–9). Students attend classes from 7:50AM (Start of Period One) to 2:43PM (End of Period Nine) Most students go to Valley Stream Central High School when finished with their 9th grade year. The school offers many clubs and extracurricular activities in various interest fields such as art, academia, sports, and social fields.

High schools
Valley Stream North High School (7–12)
Valley Stream Central High School (10–12)
Valley Stream South High School (7–12)

Demographics
On December 3, 2006, Newsday reported that of 4,566 students, 55.5% are white, 16.3% are black 16.3% are Hispanic and  12.0% are "other."

Feeder schools
Students from the following grade K–6 elementary school districts graduate to attend schools in the Valley Stream Central High School District:
Valley Stream 13 Union Free School District
Valley Stream 24 Union Free School District
Valley Stream 30 Union Free School District

External links
District Website
District History
New York State School Boards Association

References

Valley Stream, New York
School districts in New York (state)
Education in Nassau County, New York